Károly Balzsay (born 23 July 1979) is a Hungarian former professional boxer who competed from 2004 to 2012. He won the WBO super-middleweight title in 2009 by defeating Denis Inkin, making one successful defence before losing to Robert Stieglitz later that year. In 2011, Balzsay defeated Stanyslav Kashtanov to win the vacant WBA (Regular) super-middleweight title, also making one defence the following year.

Amateur highlights
Member of the Hungarian Olympic team of Sydney at Light Middleweight
Member of the Hungarian Olympic team of Athens at Middleweight
Silver medalist in the 2002 European Amateur Boxing Championships, Perm, Russia
7x Hungarian amateur champion
Amateur record: W231-L27-D2 (72KO's)

2000 Olympic Results - Boxed as a Light Middleweights (71 kg)
1st Round - Bye
Round of 16 - Lost to Pornchai Thongburan of Thailand, 12-17
2004 Olympic Results - Boxed as a Middleweights (75 kg)
Round of 32 - Defeated Sahraoui Mohamed of Tunisia, 29-24
Round of 16 - Lost to Yordanis Despaigne of Cuba, 38-25

Professional career
He made his professional debut on September 11, 2004 in the Kisstadion of Budapest against Milojko Pivljanin of Serbia and Montenegro.

In January, 2009 he won the WBO super middleweight title from Denis Inkin and became the third Hungarian World Champion of Universum Box-Promotion after István Kovács and Zsolt Erdei.

In August 2009 he lost the title on his second defense against Robert Stieglitz by an 11th round TKO.

Professional boxing record

References

External links

|-

1979 births
Living people
People from Kecskemét
Middleweight boxers
Super-middleweight boxers
Boxers at the 2000 Summer Olympics
Boxers at the 2004 Summer Olympics
Olympic boxers of Hungary
World Boxing Organization champions
Hungarian male boxers
Sportspeople from Bács-Kiskun County